Forward is a surname. People bearing it include:
 Allen Forward (1921–1994), Welsh international rugby union player
 Chauncey Forward (1793–1839), American politician
 Jonathan Forward, (1680–1760), English merchant
 Oliver Forward (1781–1834), America government official
 Robert L. Forward (1932–2002), American physicist and writer
 Bob Forward (born 1958), American film director and son of Robert L. Forward
 Eve Forward (born 1972), American writer and daughter of Robert L. Forward
 Walter Forward (1786–1852), American jurist, politician, and government administrator
 Steve Forward (born 1954), English recording engineer and producer

See also

Forward (disambiguation)